Kimanis–Keningau Highway is a state highway in Sabah, Malaysia, connecting the town of Kimanis to Keningau. It also acts as an alternative for Federal Route 500 from Kota Kinabalu to Tenom which is nowadays somewhat under-use. The  highway began as a main logging road before being upgraded to a full two-lane highway. The highway was opened to traffic in 2006.

Even though the highway is relatively short and is in very good condition, it is notorious for its very steep gradients along the way, ranging from 10% to about 25%, making the Kimanis–Keningau Highway as the steepest highway in Malaysia. As a result, climbing road lanes are provided at steep sections.

It is reported that at the gravity hill, there is a slope which appears as a downhill slope, but is actually an uphill slope.

Rest and restaurant stops
There are at least three popular stops along the highway:

Jabatan Perhutanan Station
Dimie Mountain resort
Oyong Restaurant

These stops are popular for motorists especially lorries, buses and tourists. The punishing steep gradient made it necessary for the lorries to make frequent stops and replenish their water-cooling tanks. From the high vantage point of Dimie Resort there is a panaromic view of the Brunei Bay and the Klias Bay to the west and glimpse of the Keningau Plain. The Liawan river and the Pampang river, which flow into the Keningau Plain, arise from the divide provided by the Crocker Range.

List of interchanges

See also
 List of gravity hills

Notes
 Many local people especially Keningau compare that Kimanis–Keningau Highway is like Mount Haruna or manga series Initial D under the fictional name Akina (秋名) because of their structure road is almost same with Mount Haruna.

References

Highways in Malaysia
Roads in Sabah